James Patrick Burke (born 4 February 1971) is a former Australian politician. He was a Labor Party member of the Northern Territory Legislative Assembly between 2005 and 2008, representing the electorate of Brennan. James Burke is perhaps most famous for his shock defeat of his namesake (but no relation), the Opposition Leader Denis Burke, at the 2005 election. Although even he had not expected to be victorious, he swept aside the incumbent member, and won what had been the CLP's safest seat with a swing of more than 20%.

|}

James Burke was born in Port Moresby, Papua New Guinea in 1971. His family were due to move to Darwin just after Christmas of 1974, but were delayed by the onset of Cyclone Tracy, which virtually obliterated the city. The family eventually moved to Darwin in 1976. James studied politics and law at the University College of the Northern Territory (then part of the University of Queensland), but switched to the equivalent course at the new Northern Territory University in 1989. He was involved in student politics throughout his time at university.

James was a founding member of the Darwin Youth Sister City Organisation (DYSCO), a community youth group within the Darwin City Council's Sister Cities programs. He was also a member of the Haikou Sister City Community Committee. In 1994, James was one of four students to go to Haikou, China on a 12-month exchange. He also assisted in the formation of the Ambon Youth Sister Cities Group.

James was employed in the Northern Territory Public Service from 1995 to 2000, in Territory Health Services then the Office of the Public Trustee. In addition, James served with the Army Reserves for approximately 3 years. James went to Melbourne to pursue his legal career having been unable to secure a position with a local firm.  He worked as a solicitor for 11 months with Gadens Lawyers then approximately 3½ years with Maurice Blackburn Cashman, before returning to the Territory in August 2004 to take up a position as Industrial Officer with the Liquor, Hospitality and Miscellaneous Union (LHMU).

James married Sharon McKenzie in August 1999 and has a step-daughter Leesa, and sons Brandon and Flynn.

On 9 August 2008, a general election for the Legislative Assembly of the Northern Territory was held, resulting in James Burke losing his seat of Brennan to Peter Chandler of the CLP.

Following this, James Burke worked as a solicitor for leading Darwin law firm, Ward Keller Lawyers in their Litigation Division.

In April 2009, James became an Advisor to the Chief Minister of the Northern Territory, Hon. Paul Henderson.

References

 

1971 births
Living people
Australian Labor Party members of the Northern Territory Legislative Assembly
Australian public servants
Members of the Northern Territory Legislative Assembly
Charles Darwin University alumni
21st-century Australian politicians